The common yellowthroat (Geothlypis trichas) is a New World warbler. In the U.S. Midwest, it is also known as the yellow bandit. It is an abundant breeder in North America, ranging from southern Canada to central Mexico. The genus name Geothlypis is from Ancient Greek geo, "ground", and thlupis, an unidentified small bird; thlypis is often used in the scientific names of New World warblers.

Description

Common yellowthroats are small songbirds that have olive backs, wings and tails, yellow throats and chests, and white bellies. Adult males have black face masks which stretch from the sides of the neck across the eyes and forehead, which are bordered above with white or gray. Females are similar in appearance, but have paler underparts and lack the black mask. Immature birds are similar in appearance to the adult female. First-year males have a faint black mask which darkens completely by spring.

There are 13 races of this bird. These races differ mainly in the males' facial patterns and the brightness of the yellow underparts. The southwestern forms of this bird are the brightest and the yellowest below.

Measurements:

 Length: 
 Weight: 
 Wingspan:

Habits
The breeding habitats of these birds are marshes and other wet areas with dense low vegetation, and may also be found in other areas with dense shrub. However, these birds are less common in dry areas. Females appear to prefer males with larger masks. Common yellowthroats nest in low areas of the vegetation, laying 3–5 eggs in a cup-shaped nest. Both parents feed the young.

Northern races are nocturnal migrants, wintering in the southern parts of the breeding range, Central America and the West Indies. Southern forms are largely resident. This species is a very rare vagrant to western Europe.

These birds feed on insects, which are usually captured in dense vegetation, but sometimes caught in midair.

The common yellowthroat's song is a loud . Its call is a soft jip.

Population
Despite a decline in numbers in some areas, which is due to loss of favoured habitat, this species is still very common.

Migration
Routes of migration vary based on the season and location of common yellowthroats. During fall migration, from August to October, common yellowthroats in Canada, Western, Eastern, and Central U.S., and regions outside of the United States all have unique migration routes. When migrating in the fall months, all adults and immature individuals tend to arrive at their migration destinations around the same time. Migration differences in timing and routes are also seen during the spring months from early February to late May in these same groups across the United States, Canada, and other areas. However, males generally arrive at their destination site before the females during the spring migration months. During both fall and spring migration, many birds take time to rest during a stopover period. Some individuals stay at their stopover destinations for several weeks or months while others spend only a few days resting before they continue on in their migration patterns to their final destination.

One place of study on common yellowthroat migration that is unique and worth noting is Appledore Island, Maine. Common yellowthroats here typically migrate to this island during the spring months displaying distinct patterns of movement and stopover ecology. Analysis of the common yellowthroat spring migration from April to June was observed by researchers from the Department of Biology at Canisius College in Buffalo, New York, to determine patterns of migration and time spent resting on the island before continuing on their journey. Birds returning for more than the second time arrive earlier than birds migrating to the island for their first time. Every year, males tend to arrive on the island an average of five days earlier than females weighing more than the females upon arrival. One possible explanation for the early arrival of males to this island is the ability of males to set up territories before the females arrive. This could give them better access to resources and a higher likelihood of finding a female. However, both sexes spend about a week on the island before leaving.

Migration of common yellowthroats in Florida has also been extensively studied. In Florida, the common yellowthroat can be found more often in the southern peninsular region rather than the northern panhandle region closer to the mainland of the United States. Peak migration times of the birds in this region are during the last week of September through the second week of October. Not as much is known about spring migration in Florida, but the patterns appear similar to that of the autumn migration.

Future studies are needed to understand specific migration patterns of common yellowthroats in other parts of the United States.

References

External links

Common Yellowthroat Species Account - Cornell Lab of Ornithology
Common yellowthroat - Geothlypis trichas - USGS Patuxent Bird Identification InfoCenter
Common yellowthroat at Animal Diversity Web
 Common yellowthroat bird sound at Florida Museum of Natural History
 
 
 

common yellowthroat
Birds of North America
Birds of the United States
Birds of the Dominican Republic
common yellowthroat
Taxa named by Carl Linnaeus
Extant Pleistocene first appearances